Children of the Unicorn is the 12th album by Irish folk music group The Irish Rovers. It is an album of songs for children, and features a re-recording of their 1968 hit, "The Unicorn".

Track listing
Side 1
 "Puff, the Magic Dragon"
 "Snoopy vs. the Red Baron"
 "The Lollipop Tree"
 "The Music Man"
 "Katrina"
 "Jack and the Beanstalk"
 "Kid's Medley/Two"
 "Golden Slumber"
 "The Sandman"
 "Morning Town Ride"
Side 2
 "Bun Worrier, Twerp and Me"
 "The Little Match Girl"
 "The Fox Went Out on a Chilly Night"
 "Kid's Medley/One"
 "Two Little Boys"
 "Si Mon Moine Voulait Danser"
 "The Littlest Leprachaun"
 "Drover's Dream"
 "The Unicorn"
 "Purple People Eater"

The Irish Rovers albums
1976 albums